Dmitry Igorevich Polishchuk (born 8 February 1987 in Sochi) is a Russian windsurfer. He competed at the 2012 Summer Olympics in the RS:X class.

Results

References

External links
 
 
 

1987 births
Living people
Russian male sailors (sport)
Olympic sailors of Russia
Sailors at the 2012 Summer Olympics – RS:X
Sportspeople from Sochi
Russian windsurfers